Arithmomania (from Greek , "number", and , "compulsion") is a mental disorder that may be seen as an expression of obsessive–compulsive disorder (OCD). Individuals experiencing this disorder have a strong need to count their actions or objects in their surroundings.

Those with arithmomania may, for instance, feel compelled to count the steps while ascending or descending a flight of stairs or to count the number of letters in words. They often feel it is necessary to perform an action a certain number of times to prevent alleged calamities. Other examples include counting tiles on the floor or ceiling, the number of lines on the highway, or simply the number of times one breathes or blinks, or touching things a certain number of times such as a door knob or a table.

Arithmomania sometimes develops into a complex system in which the person assigns values or numbers to people, objects and events in order to deduce their coherence. Sometimes numbers are linked to the past events and the person remembers the events again and again by particular numerical values. One performs their actions a particular number of times, and this number is linked to their particular satisfied event. Counting may be done aloud or in thought.

Folklore
European folklore concerning vampires often depicts them with arithmomania, such as a compulsion to count seeds or grains of millet. Count Von Count, a vampire character on Sesame Street, is known for counting everything and anything.

References

Anxiety disorders
Mania